Cullors is a surname. Notable people with the surname include:

Derrick Cullors (born 1972), American football player
Patrisse Cullors (born 1983), American artist and activist